The Day is a 1960 short film co-written and directed by Peter Finch. It is a fictionalized documentary on a young boy's life on the Spanish island of Ibiza.  Music by Sir Eugene Goossens, for string quartet, percussion and flute.

Plot
A little Spanish boy (Antonion Costa) goes from his village with his donkey and cart to the city to bring the news of the birth of a child.

Production
Although Finch was best known as an actor, he had worked as a writer and director before, notably on stage. He also helped make the documentary Primitive Peoples (1949).

Reception
The film won awards at the 1961 Venice Festival of Children's Films, and Cork Festival in Ireland. Finch had hopes to direct a feature film, an adaptation of Derek Monsey's World War II novel The Hero but could not get the finance.

References

1960 short films
1960 films
Films set in Ibiza
British short films
1960s English-language films